Mark Peters may refer to:

Mark Peters (footballer, born 1972), Welsh football player for Mansfield Town, Rushden & Diamonds, Leyton Orient and Cambridge United
Mark Peters (footballer, born 1983), English football player for Brentford
Mark Peters (American soccer), goalkeeper who played in Costa Rica and the United States
Mark Peters (musician) (born 1975), English musician, songwriter and producer
Mark Peters (sport administrator), Australian baseball player and sports executive